Messrs. Glembay. A Drama in Three Acts from the Life of One Agramer Patrician Family (the adjective Agramer refers to Agram), is a play in three acts by the Croatian author Miroslav Krleža.

The play is divided into three acts, dealing with the events and the rift within the family Glembay. Messrs. Glembay is the first of three plays in the Glembay cycle which includes the dramas In Agony and Leda. The drama is commonly performed in the standard repertoire of major theatres across Croatia, and it is considered a classic of Croatian literature.

English translation of Gospoda Glembajevi (The Glembays) is available in Harbors Rich in Ships: Selected Revolutionary Writings. Translated by Željko Cipriš. New York: Monthly Review Press, 2017.

The play was adapted into a 1988 feature film The Glembays, directed by Antun Vrdoljak, and starring Mustafa Nadarević as Leone Glembay and Ena Begović as Baroness Castelli-Glembay.

Characters

 Naci (Ignjat, Jacques) Glembay, banker, owner of company Glembay Ltd., first secret adviser (69 year old)
 Baroness Castelli–Glembay, his second legitimate wife (45 year old)
 Dr. Phil. Leone Glembay, Ignjat's son from his first wife née Basilides–Danielli (38 year old)
 Sister Angelika Glembay, Dominican, widow from Glembay's son Ivan, née Baroness Zygtmuntowicz Beatrix (29 year old)
 Titus Andronicus Fabriczy-Glembay, Glembay's cousin, bishop emeritus (69 year old)
 Dr. Iuris Puba Fabriczy-Glembay, lawyer, law adviser of company Glembay Ltd., his son (28 year old)
 Dr. Med. Paul Altmann, physician (51 year old)
 Dr. Theol. et Phil. Alojzije Silberbrandt, adviser of baroness's son and her confesseur (39 year old)
 Oliver Glembay, son of Baroness Castelli and banker Glembay (17 year old)
 Ulanski Oberleutanant Von Ballocsanszky, army lieutenant (24 year old)

Sources

»GOSPODA GLEMBAJEVI. Drama u tri čina iz života jedne agramerske patricijske obitelji« 

Works by Miroslav Krleža
Plays by Miroslav Krleža
1929 plays
Zagreb in fiction
Croatian works adapted into films